
Year 464 (CDLXIV) was a leap year starting on Wednesday (link will display the full calendar) of the Julian calendar. At the time, it was known as the Year of the Consulship of Rusticus and Olybrius (or, less frequently, year 1217 Ab urbe condita). The denomination 464 for this year has been used since the early medieval period, when the Anno Domini calendar era became the prevalent method in Europe for naming years.

Events 
<onlyinclude>

By place

Roman Empire 
 Olybrius is elected Roman consul by the Eastern court in Constantinople.

Europe 
 The Suevic nation in Galicia (Northern Spain) is unified under King Remismund.
 King Theodoric II sends Remismund gifts (for recognizing his kingship), including weapons, and a Gothic princess for a wife.
 Aegidius dies (possibly poisoned) and is succeeded by his son Syagrius, who becomes ruler of the Domain of Soissons (Gaul).

Births 
 Hashim ibn 'Abd Manaf, great-grandfather of Mohammed (approximate date)
 Wu Di, Chinese emperor of the Liang Dynasty (d. 549)

Deaths 
 Aegidius, Roman general (magister militum) (approximate date)
 Conall Gulban, king of Tir Chonaill (approximate date)
 Wang Xianyuan, empress and wife of Xiao Wu Di (b. 427) 
 Xiao Wu Di, emperor of the Liu Song Dynasty (b. 430)

References